Air Commodore Sir John Adrian Chamier,   (26 December 1883 – 3 May 1974) was a British officer of the Royal Air Force. Chamier is known as "The Founding Father of the ATC" for his role in the foundation of the Air Training Corps.

Military career

Indian Army and Royal Air Force
Chamier was educated at the Royal Military College, Sandhurst. After passing out on 27 August 1902, his name was added to the Unattached List of the Indian Army, and he was in October posted to the Punjab command. He was commissioned into the Indian Army as a second lieutenant on 11 January 1904, but with seniority from 27 August 1902, and on 5 February 1904 was attached to the 33rd Punjabis, an Indian Army regiment. He was promoted captain on 27 August 1911. Chamier was commissioned as a flying officer into the Royal Flying Corps on 26 August 1915 and served as a pilot in the First World War.

After the war, he transferred to the newly formed Royal Air Force, in which he served the rest of his career, eventually retiring in 1929. From November 1921 to February 1922, as Deputy Director, Directorate of Operations and Intelligence, Air Ministry, he was a delegate to the Washington Conference on the Limitation of Armaments.

Air Training Corps
After retirement from the RAF, Chamier became secretary of the Air League of the British Empire.  During his tenure as secretary Chamier became involved with the founding, in 1938 of the Air Defence Cadet Corps, which on 5 February 1941 evolved into the Air Training Corps because the ADCC was seen as too forceful and decided to change it to a more subtle name of ATC. He set up the ATC to promote recruitment in the RAF and to get young people who are interested in aviation to be able to go to their local squadron at their own free will, making it more enjoyable.

After it was founded, Chamier became the Air Training Corps' first Commandant, until his retirement in 1944.  He was succeeded by Air Marshal Sir Leslie Gossage.

Civilian career
Between 1928 and 1931 Chamier was a director on the board of Vickers (Aviation) Limited.

Chamier was, at one time, the aviation correspondent for the British Broadcasting Corporation (BBC).

Aircraft
Chamier had a Mignet HM.14 Flying Flea light aircraft registered G-ADME in his name between 1935 and 1938.

Decorations

Chamier received several decorations for his service to the British Empire.  He was made a Companion of the Order of the Bath, the Order of St. Michael and St. George and the Distinguished Service Order, and an Officer of the Order of the British Empire. In 1944 he was knighted as a Knight Bachelor.

Politics
Chamier was a member of and speaker at meetings of the January Club of the British Union of Fascists.

Published works
The Birth of the Royal Air Force, Pitman, London, (1943) (No ISBN),  British Library Catalogue Entry

References

External links
 Air of Authority - A History of RAF Organisation - Air Commodore Sir John Chamier 

1883 births
1974 deaths
Royal Air Force officers
British Army personnel of World War I
Royal Air Force personnel of World War I
Knights Bachelor
Companions of the Order of the Bath
Companions of the Order of St Michael and St George
Companions of the Distinguished Service Order
Officers of the Order of the British Empire
Royal Flying Corps officers
British Indian Army officers
British World War I pilots
British fascists
Graduates of the Royal Military College, Sandhurst